Guy Alonzo Frederick William Jewell  (6 October 1916 – 23 December 1965) was an English first-class cricketer.

A left-handed batsman who bowled slow left-arm wrist-spin, Jewell made his county cricket debut for Berkshire in the 1938 Minor Counties Championship against Wiltshire. He played in five Minor Counties matches for the county, his last appearance coming against Oxfordshire in the same year.

He was commissioned as a second lieutenant in the Royal Artillery in 1940. He served throughout the war, ending it with the rank of acting major. He was awarded the Military Cross in 1945.

In 1950, Jewell represented the Hampshire Second XI in the 1950 Minor Counties Championship against Middlesex Second XI. In 1952 he made his final Minor Counties appearance for Hampshire Second XI in a match against Surrey Second XI.

He represented Hampshire in one first-class match in 1952 against Glamorgan. In Glamorgan's second innings he took a single wicket, that of Willie Jones.

Jewell was a highly successful bowler in club cricket for the Basingstoke and North Hants cricket club, taking more than 100 wickets each season from 1948 to 1956. He several times took all 10 wickets in an innings, and in one 12-a-side match in 1956 he took all 11 wickets. His name is remembered in the Guy Jewell Cup, a cricket knockout competition which he set up in 1952, which is hosted by Basingstoke and North Hants.

Jewell died in Basingstoke, Hampshire, on 23 December 1965. At the time of his death he was Deputy Head Teacher and head of Mathematics at Queen Mary's School for Boys, Basingstoke, where he had worked since the 1930s, interrupted only by the war.

References

External links

1916 births
1965 deaths
People from Basingstoke and Deane
Recipients of the Military Cross
English cricketers
Berkshire cricketers
Hampshire cricketers
British Army personnel of World War II
Royal Artillery officers